Bertrand Marie Ponce Francois Raphael Lucigne, Prince de Faucigny-Lucinge et Coligny, also known as Prince de Cystria (13 December 1898 Paris – 22 February 1943 Paris) was a French racecar driver. He made one attempt at the Indy 500 in 1923 and made a top ten finish.

Indy 500 results

Personal life

On 28 August 1919 he married Princess Paule Murat. They divorced in 1926. On 26 December 1927 he married Maria Lydia Hualberta Lloveras.

References

1898 births
1943 deaths
French racing drivers
Indianapolis 500 drivers
Racing drivers from Paris
French princes
House of Faucigny